Gorganrud is a river in northeastern Iran. It begins in Mount Aladagh, located in the North Khorasan Province. Flowing through the Golestan Province, it ends at the Caspian Sea.

The condition of the Gorganrud estuary is of concern, partly as a result of upstream water use, including several dams, such as the Voshmgir, Golestan and Bostan.

Flash flooding occurred in 2001, with 300 fatalities, notably in the Madarsoo subcatchment upstream from Golestan Dam, including in Golestan National Park.

References

Landforms of North Khorasan Province
Landforms of Golestan Province
Tributaries of the Caspian Sea
Rivers of North Khorasan Province
Rivers of Golestan Province